This is the list of presidents of Emilia–Romagna since 1970.

List of presidents

Timeline

Presidents by time in office

Politics of Emilia-Romagna
Emilia-Romagna